Anthony Leo is a Canadian filmmaker and producer best known for producing the 2017 animated film The Breadwinner, which earned him an Academy Award for Best Animated Feature nomination at the 90th Academy Awards.

Filmography
 2017: The Breadwinner (producer) 
 2017: Todd and the Book of Pure Evil: The End of the End (executive producer) 
 2017: Terrific Women (TV Series) (executive producer - 9 episodes) 
 2017: Bruno & Boots: The Wizzle War (TV Movie) (producer) 
 2017: Bruno & Boots: This Can't Be Happening at Macdonald Hall (TV Movie) (producer) 
 2016: Bruno & Boots: Go Jump in the Pool (TV Movie) (producer) 
 2016: Raising Expectations (TV Series) (producer - 26 episodes) 
 2015: Heroes Reborn: Dark Matters (TV Mini-Series) (producer - 6 episodes) 
 2013: Justin Bieber's Believe (Documentary) (co-producer) 
 2013: Love Me (producer) 
 2012: Hiding (Video) (producer) 
 2012: Cybergeddon Zips (TV Series) (producer - 4 episodes) 
 2012: Cybergeddon (TV Series) (producer - 9 episodes) 
 2011-2012: What's Up Warthogs! (TV Series) (producer - 40 episodes) 
 2010-2012: Todd and the Book of Pure Evil (TV Series) (executive producer, producer) 
 2008: Roxy Hunter and the Horrific Halloween (TV Movie) (producer) 
 2008: Roxy Hunter and the Secret of the Shaman (TV Movie) (co-producer) 
 2008: Roxy Hunter and the Myth of the Mermaid (TV Movie) (producer) 
 2007: Roxy Hunter and the Mystery of the Moody Ghost (TV Movie) (co-producer) 
 2003: Todd and the Book of Pure Evil''' (Short) (producer) 
 2003: Squeezebox'' (Short) (producer)

References

External links
  
 

Canadian animated film producers
Living people
Year of birth missing (living people)
Place of birth missing (living people)